WYAS may refer to:

 WYAS (FM), a radio station (92.1 FM) licensed to Luquillo, Puerto Rico
 Archaeological Services WYAS, part of West Yorkshire Joint Services, England
 West Yorkshire Archive Service, part of West Yorkshire Joint Services, England
 WZOL, a Puerto Rican radio station (98.9 FM) which held the call sign WYAS from 2007 to 2009